Adicción, Tradición, Revolución is the Voodoo Glow Skulls' seventh full-length album. It was released on November 2, 2004 on Victory Records. The song "Used to Love Her" is a cover song of the original by Guns N' Roses.

Track listing

References

Voodoo Glow Skulls albums
2004 albums
Victory Records albums